John Read (27 February 1926 – 12 April 2000) was a British bobsledder. He competed in the four-man event at the 1956 Winter Olympics.

References

External links
 

1926 births
2000 deaths
British male bobsledders
Olympic bobsledders of Great Britain
Bobsledders at the 1956 Winter Olympics
Place of birth missing